Northampton was a parliamentary constituency (centred on the town of Northampton), which existed until 1974.

It returned two Members of Parliament (MPs) to the House of Commons of the Parliament of the United Kingdom until its representation was reduced to one member for the 1918 general election.  The constituency was abolished for the February 1974 general election, when it was replaced by the new constituencies of Northampton North and Northampton South.

A former MP of note for the constituency was Spencer Perceval, the only British Prime Minister to be assassinated.

Members of Parliament

MPs 1295–1640

1295: constituency established, electing two MPs

MPs 1640–1918

MPs 1918–1974

Election results

Elections in the 1830s

 

 

 

 After the election, a 13-day scrutiny was approved by the Mayor and tallies were revised to 1,570 for Robinson, 1,279 for Vernon Smith, 1,157 for Gunning, and 185 for Lyon. 188 votes were rejected.

Elections in the 1840s

Elections in the 1850s
Vernon Smith was appointed Secretary of State for War, requiring a by-election.

 

 

 
 

 

Vernon Smith was appointed President of the Board of Control, requiring a by-election.

 
 

 

 

 
 

 

Vernon Smith was raised to the peerage, becoming 1st Baron Lyveden, and causing a by-election.

Elections in the 1860s

Elections in the 1870s

 

 

 

Gilpin's death caused a by-election.

Elections in the 1880s

 

Bradlaugh was unseated after voting in the Commons before taking the Oath of Allegiance, causing a by-election.

 

Bradlaugh was expelled from the House of Commons due to his continuing prevention from taking the Oath, causing a by-election.

 

Bradlaugh resigned and sought election once more, after a resolution to exclude him from the precincts of the House of Commons was sought.

Elections in the 1890s
Bradlaugh's death caused a by-election.

Elections in the 1900s

Elections in the 1910s

A General Election was due to take place by the end of 1915. By the summer of 1914, the following candidates had been adopted to contest that election. Due to the outbreak of war, the election never took place.
British Socialist Party: Ben Tillett

Elections in the 1920s

Elections in the 1930s 

General Election 1939–40

Another General Election was required to take place before the end of 1940. The political parties had been making preparations for an election to take place and by the Autumn of 1939, the following candidates had been selected; 
Conservative: 
Labour: Reginald Paget
British Union: Norah Elam

Elections in the 1940s

Elections in the 1950s

Elections in the 1960s

Elections in the 1970s

References 

 Robert Beatson, "A Chronological Register of Both Houses of Parliament" (London: Longman, Hurst, Res & Orme, 1807) 
 D Brunton & D H Pennington, Members of the Long Parliament (London: George Allen & Unwin, 1954)
 Cobbett's Parliamentary history of England, from the Norman Conquest in 1066 to the year 1803 (London: Thomas Hansard, 1808) 
 

Parliamentary constituencies in Northamptonshire (historic)
Constituencies of the Parliament of the United Kingdom established in 1295
Constituencies of the Parliament of the United Kingdom disestablished in 1974
Constituencies of the Parliament of the United Kingdom represented by a sitting Prime Minister
Politics of Northampton